Brendan Kavanagh (born ), also known as "Dr K" due to his PhD in English, is a British pianist and piano teacher of Irish descent. He specializes in playing and promoting the boogie-woogie genre, almost exclusively improvised, often combined with classical, jazz, blues, rock & roll, and traditional Irish music themes. He regularly performs in open venues on public pianos, sometimes in duet formats with musically inclined passers-by or friends. He also plays the piano accordion, with emphasis on traditional Irish tunes.

Education
Kavanagh graduated from Middlesex University with first class single honours BA in English. He then obtained his MA in Anglo-Irish Literature and Drama at University College Dublin, followed by a PhD in English language and literature from University College Cork.

Online presence and open public venue performances 
In 2007, Kavanagh founded Dr. K Media Limited and changed his focus to online teaching, selling, performing and promoting piano music, with a strong emphasis on the boogie-woogie style. With the advent of smartphones which allow virtually anyone to capture and disseminate musical performances, he began performing in open public venues.

He has performed as Dr. K, often wearing his signature dark hoodie and shades, or sometimes wearing a workman's uniform, playing incognito in front of often astonished passers-by on public pianos at train stations, airports and other open public venues, mostly around London. His impromptu performances, often weaving together classical, boogie-woogie, Irish and popular themes, are captured and uploaded to his YouTube channel, where he has amassed over 1.95 million subscribers, making him as of February 2023, the 1,108th most-subscribed channel. He also broadcasts some of his performances directly, via live streaming.

References

External links
 BBC Radio London Dr K interview, "The Jo Good Show", 9 August 2019 on Facebook

1967 births
Boogie-woogie pianists
Boogie-woogie musicians
Swing pianists
British jazz pianists
British male pianists
Musicians from London
British male jazz musicians
Living people
British YouTubers